East Amherst is a suburban hamlet  northeast of downtown Buffalo, Erie County, New York, United States. It straddles the towns of Amherst and Clarence, and comprises the majority of ZIP code 14051.

History 
East Amherst is centered in an area originally known as "Transit Station", a name that has its origins in the railroad station of the New York Central "Peanut Line" that crossed Transit Road just north of Muegel Road. The New York Central Railway arrived in the area in 1854, with the completion of the Canandaigua and Niagara Falls railroads. By 1858, the completion of the railroad spurred the development of the area and other hamlets, such as Transit Station, (now East Amherst,) and Getzville. The name "Peanut Line" came from the railroad's gauge tracks. As its farmlands were developed into residential subdivisions, "East Amherst" began to emerge as the most frequently used name for the area.

Demographic information 
In 2016, East Amherst was named the most affluent community in Western New York by Buffalo Business First. As of the 2010 United States Census, East Amherst had a population of 24,914 and 7,459 housing units. In 2005, East Amherst was recognized by CNN / Money Magazine as one of the Best Places to Live (41st Finalist) in the United States.

Fire and police services 
Fire protection is primarily provided by the East Amherst Fire Department, as well as by Swormville Fire Company and Clarence Center Volunteer Fire Company.

The part of East Amherst within the town of Amherst is served by the Amherst Police Department. The part within the town of Clarence is served by the New York State Police and the Erie County Sheriff's Department.

Notable people
Dave Andreychuk, NHL forward
Scotty Bowman, Hall of Fame hockey coach
John Koelmel, former CEO of First Niagara Bank
Brooks Orpik, NHL hockey player
Jason Pominville, NHL player
Shane Sims, NHL defenseman
Raymond Walter, New York State Assemblyman
Connor Fields, Professional lacrosse player in the Premier Lacrosse League

References

External links 
  Information regarding Williamsville Central School District 
  East Amherst, NY Richest Community 
  2013/2014 Western New York School District Rankings 
  Best School Rankings 2013 and 2014 

Hamlets in New York (state)
Hamlets in Erie County, New York